Rasin, also known as Haitian roots music, is a musical style that began in Haiti in the 1970s when musicians began combining elements of traditional Haitian Vodou ceremonial and folkloric music with various musical styles. The late 20th century style of this music links to the roots of Vodou tradition, where it came to be known as mizik rasin later in Haitian Creole. Modern-day, the movement is often referred to simply as "rasin" or "racine" (in French).

Characteristics
Rasin bands combine the Vodou ceremonial and folk music traditions with various musical styles.  The Haitian Vodou musical tradition includes  "cool" rada rhythms often associated with Africa and the "hot" petro rhythms that speak of a New World, and rasin bands incorporate both styles in their music, although rarely in the same song.  On top of the basic horn and drum rhythms, melodies are layered that include structure from rock and roll and jazz.  Rasin instrumentation can include a variety of drums (including distinct rada and petro styles), rara horns, electronic keyboards, electronic drums, electric guitars, an electric bass, one or more vocalists, and other percussionists.

Most rasin song lyrics are written in Creole  and often incorporate traditional Vodou ceremonial lyrics or poetry.  Songs can speak to traditional Vodou themes such as spying and betraying, feeling lost or estranged, the need for judgement and justice, or the urge to reconnect with an ancestral homeland.  Some rasin songs are based on prayers directed to particular loa, or gods, while others may be ballads relating to Haitian mythology.  Many songs contain multiple layers of meaning, and can be interpreted as social or political commentary.  Songs often emphasize spiritual messages of tolerance, faith, justice, and universal love.  The music is upbeat and rhythmic and, like Vodou ceremonial music, intended for dancing.

History

Under the regimes of François Duvalier, and his son Jean-Claude Duvalier, the government appropriated for itself the authority of the Vodou religious traditions and made extensive use of religious leaders and traditions to assert its brutal authority and impose order.  When Jean-Claude Duvalier fled the country, a widespread dechoukaj uprooted the most oppressive elements of the former regime and attempted to separate the Vodou religion from its entanglements with the government.  Unable to do so beyond a limited extent under the Duvaliers, musicians adopted traditional Vodou folk music rhythms, lyrics, and instrumentation into a new sound that incorporated elements of rock and roll and jazz.  The movement also attracted Haitian American artists and members of the Haitian diaspora who returned to the country following the downfall of the Duvaliers.

Rasin bands often write and perform songs that contained political messages, either implicitly or explicitly.  Sanba yo wrote a song "Vaksine" as a part of a UN vaccination campaign.  "Ke'm Pa Sote" by Boukman Eksperyans, whose song title translates to "I Am Not Afraid" in English, was the most popular song at the 1990 Carnival in Port-au-Prince and was widely understood to be a criticism of the corrupt military government of General Prosper Avril. First performed during the 1992 Carnival in Port-au-Prince, just months after the presidency of Jean-Bertrand Aristide was overthrown by a military coup d'etat, RAM began regularly playing a song entitled "Fèy", the Creole word for "leaf". The song lyrics were of folkloric Vodou origins.  Despite no overt references to the political situation, it was widely played on the radio and immediately taken up throughout the country as an unofficial anthem of support for Aristide. By the summer of 1992, playing or singing the song was banned under military authority, and band founder Richard Morse was subjected to death threats from the regime.

Rasin Musicians

{|

|-

| 

A
Ayibobo
Azor

B
Beken
Belo
[[Bob Bovano|Bob Bovano]]
Boukan Ginen
Boukman Eksperyans
Buvu Ambroise
Bwa KayimanCCarole Demesmin
ChandelDDjakataEEddy Francois
Emeline Michel
Eritaj
Erol JosueGGwoup Sa (early rasin)J Jacques Schwarz-Bart
 James Germain
 John Steve Brunache

|| KKalfou Lakay
Kanpech
King Wawa
KoudjayL Lakou Mizik
 Lina Mathon Blanchet
 Lumane CasimirM Malou Beauvoir
 Manno Charlemagne
 Martha Jean-Claude
 Melanie J-B Charles
 Moonlight BenjaminNNaika
NettyP Papa BongaRRacine Figuier
RAM
Rasin Kanga
Riva Nyri Precil

||SSanba yo (early rasin)
Sanba Zao
Simbi
So AnneTTokay
Toto BissaintheWWawa
Weena
WesliZ' Zekle
 Zing Experience
 Zobop

|}

Audio samples

See also
Haitian hip hop
Haitian Vodou
Haitian Vodou drumming
Rock and roll

References

Further reading
Averill, Gage (1997).  "Day for the Hunter, Day for the Prey".  Chicago: University of Chicago Press.  .
Shacochis, Bob (1999).  The Immaculate Invasion''.  New York, New York: Penguin Publishing.  .

Haitian folk music
Afro-Caribbean music
Haitian Vodou